The Central Polk Parkway, also known as Florida State Road 570B (SR 570B), is a proposed toll road in Polk County, Florida. The proposed road is actually two separate roads—called "legs" by the Florida Department of Transportation (FDOT). The western segment will connect the Polk Parkway with State Road 60 between Bartow and Lake Wales. The eastern leg will start a few miles east of State Road 60 and run north, parallel US 27, and terminate at Interstate 4 north of Davenport. The most recent, and viable, proposed routing will connect the two "legs" together  near the CSX Intermodal Facility south of Wahneta. In December 2015, the Florida Department of Transportation announced the cancellation of any further work on the project, citing insufficient funds (a $1 billion shortfall) and low traffic volume. The project continued to have the support of the local business community and local politicians, however, and it was revived in 2018.

Beginnings

The Central Florida Parkway had its beginnings in another proposed road project, the controversial Heartland Parkway, which was proposed to connect the Lakeland area with Fort Myers. It would have run  through undeveloped land in the Florida Heartland. This proposal was supported by former governor Jeb Bush, but his successor Charlie Crist criticized the idea due primarily to environmental concerns. The northernmost segment of the Heartland Parkway segment in Polk County has been dubbed as "the fish hook" by proponents of the project. According to feasibility studies on various east–west and north–south routes throughout the state by the Florida's Turnpike Enterprise, the route from State Road 60 to the Polk Parkway was the only feasible route, meaning it would be supported by tolls alone. Further studies were funded and the project is currently past the initial planning stages.

Needs

The Central Florida Parkway fulfills a number of needs in Polk County, according to the FDOT and the road's proponents:

 It will act as a beltway around the City of Winter Haven, providing easy freeway access to the Polk Parkway and Interstate 4.
 The planned CSX freight terminal off of US 27 in Winter Haven was supposed to have created substantial truck traffic, and the proposed road would have helped keep these trucks off of local roads.
 The Clear Springs development in Bartow will double or triple Bartow's population in the next 20 years, increasing traffic substantially on State Road 60 and US 17.
 The construction of Legoland Florida on the site of the old Cypress Gardens will bring added traffic to the area.
 The road would have reduced traffic on State Road 60, US 17 and US 27.

Revival
The project was revived in early 2018, and a preliminary design was released in June 2019.

See also
 Polk Parkway
 Heartland Parkway

References

External links
 Handout with map & analysis of proposed routes
 Complete PD&E study ("corridor report")

Proposed state highways in the United States
Roads in Polk County, Florida